The Mexican (German: Die Mexikanerin) is a 1918 German silent film directed by Carl Heinz Wolff and starring Ferdinand Bonn and Conrad Veidt. It is a lost film.

Cast
 Ferdinand Bonn 
 Conrad Veidt
 Kurt Brenkendorf
 Magda Elgen
 Kurt Katch

References

Bibliography
 Bock, Hans-Michael & Bergfelder, Tim. The Concise CineGraph. Encyclopedia of German Cinema. Berghahn Books, 2009.

External links

1918 films
Films of the German Empire
German silent feature films
Films directed by Carl Heinz Wolff
German black-and-white films
1910s German films